Richard Whichello (born 27 May 1967) is a former British tennis player.

Career
At the 1988 Wimbledon Championships, Whichello was given a wild card entry into the main draw and faced German Tore Meinecke in the first round. He lost the match in four sets. Soon after, Whichello was one of three young British players called up for a 1988 Davis Cup tie against Austria in Zell am See. He played in the fifth match against Thomas Muster and was beaten in straight sets, as Austria secured a 5–0 win. His good year continued when he partnered David Ison to win the doubles title at an ATP Challenger tournament in Knokke, Belgium. In December, while training in the United States, Whichello suffered a prolapsed disc in his back, an injury that would sideline him for seven months.

Challenger titles

Doubles: (1)

See also
List of Great Britain Davis Cup team representatives

References

External links
 
 
 

1967 births
Living people
English male tennis players
British male tennis players
Tennis people from Greater London